Stephen John Caple (born 7 June 1984) is an English cricketer.  Caple is a right-handed batsman who plays primarily as a wicketkeeper. He was born in Hereford, Herefordshire.

Caple represented the Gloucestershire Cricket Board in a single List A match against the Surrey Cricket Board in the 1st round of the 2003 Cheltenham & Gloucester Trophy which was held in 2002.  In 2008, he played a single MCCA Knockout Trophy match for Herefordshire against Wiltshire.

References

External links
Stephen Caple at Cricinfo
Stephen Caple at CricketArchive

1984 births
Living people
Sportspeople from Hereford
English cricketers
Gloucestershire Cricket Board cricketers
Herefordshire cricketers
Wicket-keepers